Nemesia strumosa, Cape jewels or pouch nemesia, is a species of flowering plant in the family Scrophulariaceae, native to the southwestern Cape Provinces of South Africa. Suited for garden applications such as beds, borders, rock gardens and containers, its cultivars (many of which are actually hybrids with Nemesia versicolor) come in a wide variety of flower colors, including bicolored. When grown as a coolweather annual it can be planted in USDA zones 2 through 10.

References

strumosa
Garden plants of Southern Africa
Endemic flora of South Africa
Flora of the Cape Provinces
Plants described in 1836